Tropidophora is a genus of land snails with an operculum, terrestrial gastropod mollusks in the family Pomatiidae.

Distribution 
These large, split-sole snails are found in Tanzania, Madagascar, the Mascarenes, the Comoros and South Africa.

95-99% of Tropidophora species are endemic to Madagascar.

Species 
The present classification of this genus into three subgenera, 95 species and 142 varieties is complex and confused. This classification is best ignored temporarily, as it is based on subtle morphological varieties among small samples. It is also assumed that many smaller species remain to be discovered.

The following species are recognised in the genus Tropidophora:

Tropidophora aequatoria 
Tropidophora alluaudi 
Tropidophora alternans 
Tropidophora ambilobeensis 
Tropidophora anceps 
Tropidophora andrakarakarensis 
Tropidophora andrapangana 
Tropidophora articulata 
Tropidophora aspera 
Tropidophora balteata 
Tropidophora bathiei 
Tropidophora bemaraensis 
Tropidophora besalampiensis 
Tropidophora betsileoensis 
Tropidophora bicarinata 
Tropidophora boucheti 
Tropidophora calcarea 
Tropidophora carinata 
Tropidophora carnicolor 
Tropidophora castanea 
Tropidophora cavernarum 
Tropidophora cecionii 
Tropidophora chavani 
Tropidophora chromium 
Tropidophora cincinna 
Tropidophora comburens 
Tropidophora concinna 
Tropidophora consocia 
Tropidophora coquandiana 
Tropidophora crenulata 
Tropidophora creplini 
Tropidophora cuvieriana 
Tropidophora deburghiae 
Tropidophora deliciosa 
Tropidophora delmaresi 
Tropidophora denisi 
Tropidophora denselirata 
Tropidophora deshayesiana 
†Tropidophora desmazuresi 
Tropidophora diegoensis 
Tropidophora dingeoni 
Tropidophora erlangeri 
Tropidophora eugeniae 
Tropidophora eustola 
Tropidophora felicis 
Tropidophora feringalavaensis 
Tropidophora filopura 
Tropidophora filostriata 
Tropidophora fimbriata 
Tropidophora fivanonensis 
Tropidophora formosa 
Tropidophora foveolata 
Tropidophora franzhuberi 
Tropidophora freyi 
Tropidophora fulvescens 
Tropidophora fuscula 
Tropidophora gallorum 
Tropidophora gardineri 
Tropidophora goudotiana 
Tropidophora grisea 
Tropidophora hartvigiana 
Tropidophora hildebrandti 
Tropidophora humberti 
Tropidophora humbloti 
Tropidophora humbug 
Tropidophora icterica 
Tropidophora insularis 
Tropidophora interrupta 
Tropidophora ivongoensis 
Tropidophora johnsoni 
Tropidophora lamarckii 
Tropidophora letourneuxi 
Tropidophora lienardi 
Tropidophora ligata 
Tropidophora ligatula 
Tropidophora lincolni 
Tropidophora lineata 
Tropidophora lirata 
Tropidophora liratoides 
Tropidophora luti 
Tropidophora maignei 
Tropidophora marojeziana 
Tropidophora mauritiana 
Tropidophora michaudi 
Tropidophora microchasma 
Tropidophora milloti 
Tropidophora miocenica 
Tropidophora moniliata 
Tropidophora morondavensis 
Tropidophora moulinsii 
Tropidophora nyasana 
Tropidophora occlusa 
Tropidophora ochracea 
Tropidophora oppessulata 
Tropidophora perfecta 
Tropidophora perinetensis 
Tropidophora petiti 
Tropidophora philippiana 
Tropidophora plurilirata 
Tropidophora polyzonata 
Tropidophora principalis 
Tropidophora propeconsocia 
Tropidophora propevitellina 
Tropidophora puerilis 
Tropidophora pulchella 
Tropidophora pulchra 
Tropidophora pyrostoma 
Tropidophora reesi 
Tropidophora reticulata 
Tropidophora salvati 
Tropidophora sarcodes 
Tropidophora sarodranensis 
Tropidophora scabra 
Tropidophora secunda 
Tropidophora semidecussata 
Tropidophora semilirata 
†Tropidophora semilineata P.M.A. Morelet, 1881
Tropidophora sericea 
Tropidophora sikorae 
Tropidophora soulaiana 
Tropidophora sowerbyi 
Tropidophora surda 
Tropidophora tenuis 
Tropidophora theobaldi 
Tropidophora thesauri 
Tropidophora tomlini 
Tropidophora transvaalensis 
Tropidophora tricarinata 
Tropidophora tulearensis 
Tropidophora unicarinata 
Tropidophora vallorzi 
Tropidophora veridis 
Tropidophora vesconis 
Tropidophora vexillum 
Tropidophora vignali 
Tropidophora vincentflorensi 
Tropidophora virgata 
Tropidophora virgo 
Tropidophora vitellina 
Tropidophora vittata 
Tropidophora vuillemini 
Tropidophora winckworthi 
Tropidophora xanthocheila 
Tropidophora zanguebarica 
Tropidophora zonata

Synonyms
 Tropidophora anaglypta (Morelet, 1886): synonym of Otopoma anaglyptum Morelet, 1886
 Tropidophora boivini (L. Pfeiffer, 1857): synonym of Tropidophora tricarinata var. boivini (L. Pfeiffer, 1856): synonym of Tropidophora tricarinata (O. F. Müller, 1774)(unaccepted rank)
 Tropidophora cambieri(Bourguignat, 1889): synonym of Tropidophora letourneuxi (Bourguignat, 1887) (junior synonym)
  Tropidophora hanningtoni(G. B. Sowerby III, 1890): synonym of Tropidophora calcarea (G. B. Sowerby I, 1843) (junior synonym)
 Tropidophora huberi (Thach, 2018): synonym of Leptopoma huberi (Thach, 2018)  (original combination)
 Tropidophora madagascariensis (J. E. Gray, 1833) : synonym of Tropidophora tricarinata var. madagascariensis (J. E. Gray, 1833): synonym of Tropidophora tricarinata ((O. F. Müller, 1774)) 
 † Tropidophora miocenicum (Verdcourt, 1963): synonym of † Tropidophora miocenica (Verdcourt, 1963) (incorrect gender agreement of specific epithet)
 † Tropidophora praecursor (Neubert & Van Damme, 2012): synonym of † Omanitopsis praecursor (Neubert & Van Damme, 2012) 
 Tropidophora semilirata Fischer-Piette, F. Blanc & Salvat, 1969: synonym of Tropidophora liratoides Fischer-Piette, C. P. Blanc, F. Blanc & F. Salvat, 1993 ( junior homonym, junior secondary homonym)
 Tropidophora socotrana Godwin-Austen, 1881: synonym of Cinnabarica socotrana (Godwin-Austen, 1881) (original combination)
 Tropidophora stumpfi O. Boettger, 1889: synonym of Tropidophora fuscula (L. Pfeiffer, 1853)

References 

 Fischer-Piette, E. & Bedoucha, J. (1965). Mollusques terrestres operculés de Madagascar. Mémoires du Museum National d'Histoire Naturelle, Nouvelle Série, Série A, Zoologie, 33: 50-91. Paris

External links
 Zipcodezoo.com: Tropidophora
 Troschel F.H. (1847). Ueber die Gattungen der Cyclostomiden. Zeitschrift für Malakozoologie. 4(3): 42-45
 Möllendorff, O. F. von. (1898). Land and freshwater Mollusca from India. Nachrichtsblatt der deutschen malakozoologischen Gesellschaft. 30: 97-104, 129-160
 Martens, E. von. (1880). Mollusken. Pp. 179-353, pl. 19-22 In K. Möbius, F. Richters & E. von Martens, Beiträge zur Meeresfauna der Insel Mauritius und der Seychellen. Berlin: Gutmann

 
Pomatiidae
Taxonomy articles created by Polbot